Natalija Obrenović (15 May 1859 – 8 May 1941), née Keshko, known as Natalie of Serbia, was the Princess of Serbia from 1875 to 1882 and then Queen of Serbia from 1882 to 1889 as the wife of Milan I of Serbia. Of ethnic Romanian origin, she was the daughter of the Russian Colonel and Moldavian Princess.

A celebrated beauty during her youth, she was later regarded as one of the most beautiful queens in Europe.

Early life and ancestry
She was born in 1859 in Florence, Grand Duchy of Tuscany (now Italy), into an old noble House of Keshko, as the first child of Russian colonel Petre Keșco (1830–1865) of Bessarabia and his wife, Moldavian Princess Pulcheria Sturdza (1831–1874). Her father was the son of Ioan Keșco (1809–1863), a Marshal of Nobility of 
Bessarabia, and Romanian noblewoman Natalia Balș (1812–1830), daughter of Iordache Balș (1776-1849), Grand treasurer of Moldavia and Princess Ruxandra Sturdza (1785-1844). Maternally, she was granddaughter of Prince Nicolae Sturdza (1790-1832) and Princess Maria Ghika (1805-1887). Her great-grandfather was Ioan Sandu Sturdza, the ruling Prince of Moldavia. Natalie grew up in Dănuțeni, Bessarabia, Odessa, then part of the Russian Empire and Iași, United Romania.

She had two sisters and one brother:
 Maria (Mary) (1861–1935), who married on 13 April 1886 Prince Grigore Ghika-Brigadier (1847–1913). 
 Ecaterina (Catherine), who married on 5 February 1883 their relative Prince Eugen Ghika-Comănești (1840–1912). 
 Ioniță (John), only brother; he was the fourth and last child.

After she became orphaned by both parents, she was taken into the care by Prince Grigory Ivanovich Manucbey and her maternal aunt, Princess Ecaterina Moruzi, wife of Prince Constantin Moruzi (d. 1886), Chamberlain at the Imperial Court of Russia.

Princess and Queen

She married Prince Milan Obrenović IV of Serbia on 17 October 1875, whom she previously met at a ball in Vienna. They were second cousins, as her grandmother Nathalia was sister of Milan's grandmother Smaranda Bals, whose family dubiously claimed descent from the medieval House of Balšić. A delegation from Romania, which included members of the Romanian noble families Moruzi and Catargiu (Milan's maternal family to whom Natalia was related), attended her wedding ceremony. She had two sons with him, the future King Alexander, born 1876, whose godfather was Tsar Alexander II of Russia, and his younger brother Sergei (Sergej), who died just a few days after his birth in 1878.

When Prince Milan proclaimed the Kingdom of Serbia in 1882 after securing international recognition, Princess Natalie assumed the title and rank of a queen.

At the Easter reception of 1886, Queen Natalie publicly slapped the wife of the Greek ambassador. The Greek woman was rumored to have an affair with King Milan.

Royal conflict and divorce 1887/88
The relationship of the royal couple reached a critical level in 1887, following not only many affairs of the King with other women, but even political differences between King and Queen. The King pursued a pro-Austrian foreign policy which the Russian-born and slavophile Queen would not tolerate.

These conflict developed into a public scandal when the Queen - accompanied by her child, the eleven-year-old Crown Prince Alexander - left Serbia and settled in the Russian Crimea in May 1887. Slavophile public in Russia honoured the Serbian Queen demonstratively. Rumours spread about a royal divorce in the near future, and there was public talk about the King's abdication in favour of his son. These rumours proved to be premature - the divorce occurred one year later, the abdication followed in 1889. In July 1887, the Queen and her son returned to Belgrade, in August the Queen left her country again for Austria-Hungary. In October, the King and Queen met in Budapest for a formal reconciliation, and with the King's approval the Queen and the Crown Prince left for another foreign travel to Italy until November.

In 1888, Queen Natalie and her son left for another long foreign stay in Wiesbaden - obviously without intention to return to Belgrade. The public private scandal turned into politics when the King used the German police in July 1888 to bring the young Crown Prince back to his kingdom.

Soon afterwards King Milan opened the ecclesiastical procedures of divorce. Even the development of these procedures put a shadow on the royal reputation. The Holy Synod of the Serbian Orthodox Church met in Belgrade and declared itself incompetent in the royal divorce. When the consistorium of Belgrade took over the case the Queen rejected the King's wish for divorce and advocated the several attempts to reconcile the couple according to ecclesiastical law. When the King managed to get his divorce by a single decision of the Metropolite of the Serbian church, the Queen rejected that decision in public and demanded a return to Belgrade.

An immediate political consequence of these dynastic conflicts was the new right of succession to the throne proclaimed during the parliamentary sessions regarding the new constitution of Serbia. The new constitution declared Crown Prince Alexander and his future children (that were never born) to be single legal heirs of the Serbian crown. Possible children of a second marriage of King Milan should be excluded from succession even in the case that King Alexander's line should become extinct. A clear votum of mistrust for the former king in the handling of his family affairs that foreshadowed his following abdication in March 1889.

Conflicts with the Regency and private reconciliation
On 6 March 1889, as consequence of the surprising abdication of her (former) husband, Natalie's son Alexander I became King of Serbia. Until 1893, when Alexander assumed government himself, he was put under a regency council led by former prime minister Jovan Ristic. The former King Milan secured the educational rights for his son for himself and ordered the regency council not to allow the Queen Mother a permanent stay in Serbia during the minority of King Alexander. Short meetings between mother and son in foreign countries should be possible with permission of the regency.

Queen Natalie did not accept these restricted conditions. In August 1889, she announced publicly to visit her son in the royal palace in Belgrade. She demanded to see her son every Sunday and holiday, but was offered to see him twice a year instead with King Milan regulating. When the Queen Mother arrived in Belgrade on 29 August 1889, she was enthusiastically welcomed by the population.

But the regency denied her royal style (she should be announced just as Mme Keshko) and - after she insisted to be still the ex-king's wife and rightful Queen of Serbia - any meeting with her son. In October 1889 the ex-king and the regents allowed meetings between mother and son every 14 days - but strictly outside the royal palace.

In July 1890, the Synod of the Serbian Orthodox church declared the divorce between Milan and Natalie to be legal.

In April 1891, ex-king Milan - after several interferences in government affairs - announced his intention to leave Serbia until his son should be old enough to take over the rule. The parliament instructed the government to ask Queen Mother Natalie to act accordingly. When the Queen refused to leave the country, the police attempted to expel her by force on 18 May 1891 but a crowd of civilians fought the police and the military, resulting in two being killed and several wounded. The next day the whole force of the garrison was used to send her into exile.

In January 1893, the exiled royals Milan and Natalija reconciled and asked the Serbian government to revoke their divorce. The Metropolite and the synod declared the divorce act of 1888 illegal and the royal marriage still in force in March 1893.

Shortly afterwards their son King Alexander declared himself mature and deposed the regency council in April 1893.

Return, second exile and death

After ex-king Milan had returned to Serbia in January 1894 and took the position as deputy of his son and commander-in-chief of the army, King Alexander ordered the complete rehabilitation of his parents and the restoration of their royal prerogatives in April 1894 - despite the protests of the radical opposition. Natalie, who lived mainly in France, returned to Belgrade not before May 1895 but kept her habit of frequent foreign travels.

When King Alexander affianced himself with Draga Mašin, a former court lady of Queen Natalie, in 1900, his parents rejected the future queen as improper. His parents had previously arranged a marriage to German Princess Alexandra Karoline von Schaumburg-Lippe, sister of the Queen of Württemberg, which never took place. After that, ex-king Milan resigned as army commander and left Serbia for the rest of his life; he died in Vienna a year later, in 1901. Even the relationship between Natalie and Alexander was broken up. Because the Queen Mother was a strong opponent of her son's marriage to Draga, Natalie was banished from Serbia by her son.

King Alexander and his wife Draga were killed in 1903 during a military coup. This left Natalie the sole member of the Obrenović dynasty. She donated the inheritance to the University of Belgrade and various churches and monasteries around Serbia. The same year, Queen Natalie became a member of the Roman Catholic Church and a nun, converting from Serbian Orthodoxy.

Queen Natalie spent the remaining years of her life in exile in France. She died in 1941 in Saint-Denis, France, other sources indicate Paris. Her unpublished memoirs were kept in the Vatican, but were published in Belgrade in 1999.

References

Sources

1859 births
1941 deaths
Nobility from Florence
Obrenović dynasty
Serbian queens consort
Serbian Roman Catholics
Serbian people of Romanian descent
Former Serbian Orthodox Christians
Converts to Roman Catholicism from Eastern Orthodoxy
Immigrants to the Principality of Serbia
Recipients of the Royal Order of Kapiolani
Serbian people of Russian descent
Serbian people of German descent
Serbian people of Italian descent
Serbian people of Greek descent
20th-century French nuns
Queen mothers